Superchunk is an American indie rock band from Chapel Hill, North Carolina, United States, consisting of singer-guitarist Mac McCaughan, guitarist Jim Wilbur, bassist Laura Ballance, and drummer Jon Wurster. Formed in 1989, they were one of the bands that helped define the Chapel Hill music scene of the 1990s. Their energetic, high-velocity style and do-it-yourself ethic is influenced by punk rock.

Members McCaughan and Ballance founded the successful independent record label Merge Records in 1989 as a way to release music from Superchunk and music created by friends, which has expanded to include artists from around the world and records reaching the top of the Billboard music charts. Superchunk released a string of full-length albums and compilations throughout the 1990s. After releasing their eighth studio album in 2001, the band went into a period of reduced activity. In 2010, the band released a new studio album, Majesty Shredding, and followed it up in 2013 with their tenth studio album, I Hate Music. Their eleventh studio album, What a Time to Be Alive, was released on February 16, 2018. Their twelfth album, Wild Loneliness, was released in February 2022.

History
Superchunk was formed in 1989 in the town of Chapel Hill, North Carolina, by Mac McCaughan (guitar and vocals), Laura Ballance (bass and backing vocals), Chuck Garrison (drums), and Jack McCook (guitar). Initially, the band went by the name Chunk (original drummer Chuck Garrison's name was misspelled as "Chunk" Garrison in the phone book, and the moniker stuck), and they released their first single as Chunk. After adding the "Super" prefix to their name to avoid confusion with a similarly named jazz band from New York, the first official Superchunk single, "Slack Motherfucker", followed in 1989 on Merge Records, founded by McCaughan and Ballance. Both releases were well received, and Superchunk released its debut eponymous album in 1990 on Matador Records to more critical acclaim.

McCook decided to leave the group after the release of the first album, Superchunk, and Connecticut-born James Wilbur was recruited to take over guitar duties.  In spite of the ensuing bidding war that emerged between major record labels in the aftermath of the album's release, Superchunk decided to stay independent, sticking with Matador Records for their second, just as critically lauded LP, No Pocky for Kitty, which was recorded in Chicago by Steve Albini in 1991. Garrison left the band a few weeks before the record's release, and Jon Wurster was brought on board on drums.

The band put out one more record for Matador, On the Mouth in 1993. After Matador entered into a distribution agreement with major label Atlantic Records, Superchunk decided to leave the label, even though the Atlantic logo did not have to be displayed on their releases. Instead, the band opted to release their following records through Merge. The next album, Foolish, brought further critical acclaim for the band in 1994. A second singles compilation (the first was 1992's Tossing Seeds) came out in the summer of 1995. It was titled Incidental Music 1991–95 and contained most of their hard-to-find tracks (imports, B-sides, comp. tracks) released between 1991 and 1995.

Boston was the setting for Superchunk's next album session. 1995's Here's Where the Strings Come In was recorded at the city's Fort Apache Studios and slated for a fall release. The band toured hard for Strings all over the world as well as appearing on the Lollapalooza tour, scoring a minor hit with the "Hyper Enough" single and video.

After a brief hiatus and another Australian tour, the band released a limited-edition EP called The Laughter Guns. They then started writing for what would become Indoor Living. Recording started in Bloomington, Indiana's Echo Park Studios with Chapel Hillian John Plymale co-producing with the band. Superchunk stretched out a bit on Indoor Living, expanding their sound by adding some new instruments to the mix: piano, organ, vibes and more. The album was by far their most adventurous and at the same time their most accessible to date.

Superchunk delivered Come Pick Me Up, their seventh full-length studio release, in 1999, recording in Chicago at Electrical Audio with producer Jim O'Rourke. Superchunk continued the expansion and growth of their sound that started with Foolish, pushing themselves to new heights of creativity.

In 2001, the band released Here's to Shutting Up. In 2002, Superchunk began a series of limited-edition live albums known as The Clambakes series. Clambakes Volume 1 (limited to 1500 copies) is an acoustic live set recorded in various record stores across the US in support of Here's to Shutting Up and Clambakes Volume 2 (limited to 2500 copies) is a film score Superchunk was commissioned to write. It was recorded live at the Castro Theater in San Francisco on April 23, 2002, during the San Francisco International Film Festival at a showing of the 1926 Teinosuke Kinugasa film A Page of Madness.

Cup of Sand, released in 2003, is the third singles album compiling all singles and rare 1995–2002 tracks.

Clambakes Series Volume 3 was released in 2004, documenting the live set Superchunk played at the Cat's Cradle in Carrboro, North Carolina, on July 23, 1999, for the Merge Records tenth anniversary celebration.

In 2006, Superchunk headlined a concert held in celebration of the tenth anniversary of The Daily Show, a Comedy Central program, at Irving Plaza in New York. The show also featured a performance from Clem Snide as well as short stand-up comedy sets from various Daily Show correspondents.

In 2007, Superchunk contributed a hidden track to the Aqua Teen Hunger Force soundtrack, "Misfits and Mistakes", with singing from Aqua Teen Hunger Force character Meatwad. On June 5, 2007, Superchunk released the Misfits and Mistakes 7-inch, which has the Superchunk solo version on the A-side, and the Meatwad version on the B-side.

The band played two shows, the Eff Cancer Benefit in Chicago on June 20, 2007, and headlined the inaugural free Pool Parties show at McCarren Park Pool in Brooklyn, New York. They are also known to still play occasional one-off shows at home in North Carolina, usually at Cat's Cradle in Carrboro.

Superchunk also recorded a cover version of "Say My Name" by Destiny's Child for Engine Room Recordings' compilation album Guilt by Association, which was set to be released in September 2007.

Superchunk appeared at Coachella Valley Music and Arts Festival in Indio, California, on April 18, 2009, along with other acts like Yeah Yeah Yeahs, The Killers, M.I.A., TV on the Radio, Band of Horses.

On April 7, 2009, Superchunk released the Leaves in the Gutter EP, their first CD release in seven years. It consisted of three unreleased tracks, in addition to "Misfits and Mistakes" and an acoustic version of the new song "Learned to Surf".

On May 28, 2009, the band announced a new 7-inch, "Crossed Wires" b/w "Blinders (Fast Vers.)", which released on July 7, 2009. It was initially limited to a pressing of 1000 on clear vinyl.

On July 27, 2010, the band covered The Cure's In Between Days for AV Club Undercover.

The band's ninth studio album, Majesty Shredding, was released on September 14, 2010. The band was chosen by Jeff Mangum of Neutral Milk Hotel to perform at the All Tomorrow's Parties festival he curated in December 2011 in Minehead, Somerset.

The band's tenth studio album, I Hate Music, was released on August 20, 2013. Before the release, Ballance announced on the band's website that she would not be taking part in the upcoming tour to promote the album, citing a worsening hearing condition known as hyperacusis. Her live replacement is Jason Narducy, formerly of Verbow and currently bass player with Bob Mould's band. The band performed in North America, Australia and the UK as part of the tour.

In November 2013, the band played the final holiday camp edition of the All Tomorrow's Parties festival in Camber Sands, England.

On February 27, 2016, Superchunk re-united with original drummer Chuck Garrison for a performance of "Slack Motherfucker" at the end of a Scharpling & Wurster live show in Durham, North Carolina. Jon Wurster performed some of the vocals in character as Philly Boy Roy.

In November 2017, the band announced that their 11th studio album What a Time to Be Alive will be released in February 2018.

On May 31, 2019, as part of Merge Records' "special 30th anniversary releases," Superchunk released an acoustic version of their 1994 album Foolish, titled Acoustic Foolish.

On Feb 10, 2023, Jon Wurster announced his exit from the band.

Discography

 Superchunk (1990)
 No Pocky for Kitty (1991)
 On the Mouth (1993)
 Foolish (1994)
 Here's Where the Strings Come In (1995)
 Indoor Living (1997)
 Come Pick Me Up (1999)
 Here's to Shutting Up (2001)
 Majesty Shredding (2010)
 I Hate Music (2013)
 What a Time to Be Alive (2018)
 Wild Loneliness (2022)

Side projects
Mac McCaughan has recorded several albums as Portastatic. Initially a solo project, Portastatic has evolved into a full band, which currently includes Superchunk's Jim Wilbur as a member.

Jim Wilbur, a graduate of Fairfield University, in Fairfield, Connecticut, has recorded a number of singles and an album as Humidifier.  The album Nothing Changes was released on Link Records in 1996.  Humidifier also includes John King from another Merge Records band, Spent.

In addition to his work on The Best Show with Tom Scharpling, Jon Wurster joined the group the Mountain Goats in 2007, playing drums on the last leg of the Get Lonely tour. He has remained a member ever since.

References

External links

 
 Merge Records site
 Scharpling and Wurster
 Handwritten interview with Mac at ifpthendirt
 Interview with Mac McCaughan about "Misfits & Mistakes" + MP3 of Track!

Indie rock musical groups from North Carolina
Musical groups from Chapel Hill-Carrboro, North Carolina
Musical groups established in 1989
Merge Records artists
Matador Records artists
Musical groups from North Carolina
City Slang artists